This list contains notable cast members of the Gunsmoke radio and TV series, and TV movies. The listing includes regular cast members, guest stars, and recurring cast members.

Radio cast

Regulars
 William Conrad as Matt Dillon
 Parley Baer as Chester Wesley Proudfoot
 Howard McNear as Doc Adams
 Georgia Ellis as Kitty Russell

Recurring
While the radio series had relatively few recurring supporting characters, and those roles were often shared, the following actors played recurring roles with comparative consistency, in addition to a variety of one-time roles
 Harry Bartell played Mr. Hightower

Guest stars
Many actors appeared regularly on Gunsmoke, in the majority of episodes, but in a variety of one-shot roles; others were only heard once or twice
 Edgar Barrier
 Jeanne Bates
 Dick Beals
 Frank Cady
 Virginia Christine
 Hans Conried
 Richard Deacon
 John Dehner
 Don Diamond
 Lawrence Dobkin
 Sam Edwards
 Paul Frees
 Virginia Gregg Jerry Hausner
 Joseph Kearns
 Jack Kruschen
 John McIntire
 Junius Matthews
 Ralph Moody
 Jeanette Nolan
 Vic Perrin
 Barney Phillips
 Peggy Rea
 John Stephenson
 James Westerfield

TV cast

Regulars
 James Arness as Matt Dillon
 Amanda Blake as Kitty Russell (1955–1974)
 Milburn Stone as Doc Galen Adams
 Dennis Weaver as Chester Goode (1955–1964) Glenn Strange as Sam Noonan (1961–1973)
 Burt Reynolds as Quint Asper (1962–1965)
 Ken Curtis as Festus Haggen (1964–1975)
 Roger Ewing as Thaddeus "Thad" Greenwood (1965–1967)
 Buck Taylor as Newly O'Brien (1967–1975)

Recurring

 Tom Brown as townsman Ed O'Connor (1959, 1968–1974)
 Woodrow Chambliss as merchant Mr. Lathrop (1966–1975)
 Howard Culver as hotel clerk Howie (1955–1974)
 Robert Brubaker as townsman Jim Buck (1957–1961), as bartender Floyd (1974–1975)
 Kelton Garwood (aka Jonathan Harper) as undertaker Percy Crump (1966–1972)
 Dabbs Greer as merchant Mr. Jonas (1956–1968)
 Pat Hingle as Dr. John Chapman (1971)
 Victor Izay as bartender Bull (1970–1974)
 Ted Jordan as freight office manager Nathan Burke (1966–1975)
 James Nusser as town drunk Louie Pheeters (1956–1970)
 Hank Patterson as livery manager Hank Miller (1962–1973)
 Roy Roberts as bank manager Mr. Bodkin (1965–1975)
 Fran Ryan as Long Branch owner Hannah (1974–1975)
 Charles Seel as telegrapher Barney (1965–1974)
 Sarah Selby as boarding house owner Ma Smalley (1961–1972)
 George Selk as livery owner Moss Grimmick (1955–1964)
 Rudy Sooter as townsman Rudy (1965–1967)
 Herb Vigran as Judge Brooker (1970–1975)
 Charles Wagenheim as townsman Ed Halligan (1966–1975)

Guest stars

 John Abbott
 Stanley Adams
 Claude Akins
 Marc Alaimo
 Jack Albertson
 Mabel Albertson
 Mario Alcalde
 Norman Alden
 Fred Aldrich
 James Anderson
 John Anderson
 Richard Anderson
 Keith Andes
 Edward Andrews
 Michael Ansara
 Lou Antonio
 R. G. Armstrong
 Todd Armstrong
 Jean Arthur
 Ed Asner
 John Astin
 Malcolm Atterbury
 Barry Atwater
 Lew Ayres
 Jim Backus
 Raymond Bailey
 Joe Don Baker
 Ed Bakey
 Rayford Barnes
 Baynes Barron
 Norman Bartold
 Harry Basch
 Richard Basehart
 Ned Beatty
 Jim Beaver
 John Beck
 Noah Beery Jr.
 Ed Begley
 Ralph Bellamy
 Alma Beltran
 Susanne Benton
 Warren Berlinger
 James Best
 Ramon Bieri
 Theodore Bikel
 Billie Bird
 Dan Blocker
 Lloyd Bochner
 Sorrell Booke
 Nesdon Booth
 Bruce Boxleitner
 William Boyett
 Ray Boyle
 Stewart Bradley
 Scott Brady
 Eric Braeden
 Chet Brandenburg
 Hank Brandt
 Peter Breck
 David Brian
 Beau Bridges
 Morgan Brittany
 Charles Bronson
 Joe Brooks
 Joshua Bryant
 Edgar Buchanan
 Joyce Bulifant
 Brooke Bundy
 Michael Burns
 Ellen Burstyn (aka Ellen McRae)
 Norman Burton
 Robert Burton
 Gary Busey
 Billy Green Bush
 Archie Butler
 Sebastian Cabot
 Frank Cady
 Howard Caine
 Joseph Campanella
 William Campbell
 J. D. Cannon
 Harry Carey Jr.
 Paul Carr
 David Carradine
 John Carradine
 Conlan Carter
 John Carter
 Anthony Caruso
 Albert Cavens
 Spencer Chan
 Virginia Christine
 Lee J. Cobb
 Fred Coby
 John Colicos
 Míriam Colón
 Christopher Connelly
 Chuck Connors
 Mike Connors
 Tim Considine
 Elisha Cook Jr.
 Bill Coontz
 Charles Cooper
 Glenn Corbett
 Gretchen Corbett
 Jeff Corey
 Robert Cornthwaite
 Aneta Corsaut
 Dennis Cross
 Robert Culp
 James Daly
 Royal Dano
 Kim Darby
 Henry Darrow
 Bette Davis
 Jim Davis
 Richard Deacon
 Gloria DeHaven
 John Dehner
 Bruce Dern
 Joe De Santis
 William Devane
 Alan Dexter
 George DiCenzo
 Angie Dickinson
 Charles Dierkop
 Lawrence Dobkin
 James Doohan
 Burt Douglas
 Jerry Douglas
 Richard Dreyfuss
 Don Dubbins
 Andrew Duggan
 John Dullaghan
 Liam Dunn
 Robert Easton
 Buddy Ebsen
 Barbara Eden
 Jack Elam
 Dana Elcar
 Robert Ellenstein
 Sam Elliott
 Jena Engstrom
 Bill Erwin
 Gene Evans
 Jason Evers
 Diana Ewing
 Frank "Fidi" Fayad
 Pamelyn Ferdin
 John Fiedler
 Paul Fix
 Jay C. Flippen
 Nina Foch
 Constance Ford
 Harrison Ford
 Michael Forest
 Steve Forrest
 Jodie Foster
 Robert Foulk
 Anne Francis
 Bert Freed
 Joan Freeman
 Victor French
 Alan Fudge
 Beverly Garland
 Leif Garrett
 Will Geer
 Melissa Gilbert
 Gwynne Gilford
 Sam Gilman
 Ray Girardin
 Ned Glass
 Mark Goddard
 Thomas Gomez
 Harold Gould
 Dabbs Greer
 Julie Gregg
 James Gregory
 James Griffith
 Sam Groom
 Raymond Guth
 Herman Hack
 Joan Hackett
 Kevin Hagen
 Sid Haig
 Alan Hale Jr.
 Murray Hamilton
 Chick Hannan
 Jerry Hardin
 Mariette Hartley
 Edmund Hashim
 Johnny Haymer
 Eileen Heckart
 Katherine Helmond
 Tom Hennesy
 Chuck Hicks
 Joe Higgins
 Marianna Hill
 Robert Hogan
 Earl Holliman
 Rex Holman
 Dennis Hopper
 William Hopper
 Clint Howard
 Rance Howard
 Ron Howard
 Clyde Howdy
 Clegg Hoyt
 John Hoyt
 David Huddleston
 Marsha Hunt
 Kim Hunter
 Josephine Hutchinson
 Betty Hutton
 Craig Huxley
 Diana Hyland
 Steve Ihnat
 John Ireland
 Sherry Jackson
 Richard Jaeckel
 Anthony James
 Brion James
 Clifton James
 Salome Jens
 Roy Jenson
 James Jeter
 Ben Johnson
 Russell Johnson
 I. Stanford Jolley
 Henry Jones
 L. Q. Jones
 Mickey Jones
 Katherine Justice
 Robert Karnes
 DeForest Kelley
 Jack Kelly
 Adam Kennedy
 George Kennedy
 Richard Kiley
 Wright King
 Jess Kirkpatrick
 Werner Klemperer
 Jack Klugman
 Ted Knight
 Yaphet Kotto
 Martin Kove
 Kay E. Kuter
 Diane Ladd
 Ethan Laidlaw
 Jack Lambert
 Martin Landau
 Sue Ane Langdon
 Robert Lansing
 Peyton Langston
 John Larch
 John Lasell
 Louise Latham
 Cloris Leachman
 Michael Learned
 Anna Lee
 Lance LeGault
 Mark Lenard
 Kay Lenz
 Geoffrey Lewis
 George Lindsey
 Joanne Linville
 Jonathan Lippe
 June Lockhart
 Gary Lockwood
 Robert Loggia
 Jack Lord
 Jon Lormer
 Tom Lowell
 William Lucking
 Karl Lukas
 Keye Luke
 BarBara Luna
 Herbert Lytton
 Tom McFadden
 Darren McGavin
 Barton MacLane
 Howard McNear
 Gerald McRaney
 Arthur Malet
 Lee Majors
 Kenneth Mars
 Lynne Marta
 Arlene Martel
 Ross Martin
 Strother Martin
 Charles Maxwell
 Rose Marie
 Scott Marlowe
 Ken Mayer
 Mercedes McCambridge
 Gloria McGehee
 John McLiam
 Joseph Mell
 Troy Melton
 Robert Middleton
 Vera Miles
 Denny Miller
 Donna Mills
 Cameron Mitchell
 Ricardo Montalbán
 Ron Moody
 Harry Morgan
 Read Morgan
 Diana Muldaur
 Richard Mulligan
 Burt Mustin
 Anna Navarro
 Gene Nelson
 Lois Nettleton
 Leslie Nielsen
 Leonard Nimoy
 Jimmy Noel
 Jeanette Nolan
 Nick Nolte
 France Nuyen
 J. Pat O'Malley
 Simon Oakland
 Warren Oates
 Richard O'Brien
 Carroll O'Connor
 Tim O'Connor
 Arvo Ojala
 Ken Olandt
 Gerald S. O'Laughlin
 Susan Oliver
 James Olson
 John Orchard
 Gregg Palmer
 Tex Palmer
 Woodrow Parfrey
 Michael Pate
 Hank Patterson
 John Payne
 Leo Penn
 Vic Perrin
 Nehemiah Persoff
 Brock Peters
 George O. Petrie
 Robert Phillips
 Slim Pickens
 Robert Pine
 Ed Platt
 Suzanne Pleshette
 Joe Ploski
 Michael J. Pollard
 Judson Pratt
 Andrew Prine
 Denver Pyle
 John Quade
 Ford Rainey
 Chips Rafferty
 Dack Rambo
 Gilman Rankin
 Tom Reese
 Richard Reeves
 John Reilly
 Carl Reindel
 Stafford Repp
 Alejandro Rey
 Madlyn Rhue
 Paul Richards
 Peter Mark Richman
 Pernell Roberts
 Elizabeth Rogers
 Wayne Rogers
 Gilbert Roland
 Ruth Roman
 Andy Romano
 Katharine Ross
 Al Ruscio
 Bing Russell 
 Kurt Russell
 Fran Ryan
 Alfred Ryder
 Willard Sage
 Albert Salmi
 Steve Sandor
 Dick Sargent
 John Saxon
 William Schallert
 John Schuck
 Alex Sharp
 Karen Sharpe
 William Shatner
 Jacqueline Scott
 W. Morgan Sheppard
 Gregory Sierra
 Tom Simcox
 Joseph Sirola
 Tom Skerritt
 Hal Smith
 Milan Smith
 William Smith
 Quentin Sondergaard
 David Soul
 Olan Soule
 Aaron Spelling
 Harry Dean Stanton
 Craig Stevens
 Warren Stevens
 Charlotte Stewart (aka Charlotte Considine)
 Paul Stewart
 Guy Stockwell
 Leonard Stone
 Milburn Stone
 Don Stroud
 Liam Sullivan
 Hope Summers
 Frank Sutton
 Karl Swenson
 Loretta Swit
 Gloria Talbott
 William Talman
 Russ Tamblyn
 Vic Tayback
 Dub Taylor
 Guy Teague
 Roy Thinnes
 Brad Trumbull
 Forrest Tucker
 Cicely Tyson
 Robert Urich
 Joan Van Ark
 Lee Van Cleef
 Joyce Van Patten
 Vince Van Patten
 Robert Vaughn
 John Vernon
 Jan-Michael Vincent
 Jon Voight
 Jess Walton
 Lesley Ann Warren
 Ruth Warrick
 David Wayne
 Fritz Weaver
 Richard Webb
 Judi West
 Stuart Whitman
 James Whitmore
 Johnny Whitaker
 Grace Lee Whitney
 Peter Whitney
 Collin Wilcox
 Guinn Williams
 Noble Willingham
 Chill Wills
 William Windom
 Jason Wingreen
 Michael Witney
 Morgan Woodward
 Meg Wyllie
 Dana Wynter
 Anthony Zerbe

References

Sources
 Dunning, John. On the Air: The Encyclopedia of Old Time Radio.

Gunsmoke
Gunsmoke